In South Korea, highways that are managed by the provincial governments are called Local highways. Usually route numbers have 2~4 digits; the first digit stands for the main province of its manager.

Route Numbers 

 State-funded local highways: 2 digits
 Gyeonggi Province: 300s
 Gangwon Province: 400s
 North Chungcheong Province: 500s
 South Chungcheong Province: 600s
 North Jeolla Province: 700s
 South Jeolla Province: 800s
 North Gyeongsang Province: 900s
 South Gyeongsang Province: 1000s
 Jeju Special Self-governing Province: 1100s

State-funded local highways 
There are some 2-digits local highways, called State-funded local highways (short term of ). These highways are basically managed by province level, but its routes are designated and controlled by the South Korean government. Also, most of 2-digits Local highways stand for planned extension route of the same-number national highways or candidates for upgrading to national routes.

Abolished State-funded local highway

List of the routes 
These are the list of the routes. For the state-funded local highway, See #State-funded local highways.

Gyeonggi Province (300s) 
A lot of Local highways of Gyeonggi Province were changed in 1996 and 2005.
 ■(#CCDDCC) is origin or terminus that is not located in Gyeonggi Province.

Gangwon Province (400s)

South Gyeongsang Province (1000s) 
 ■(#CCDDCC) is origin or terminus that is not located in South Gyeongsang Province.

Jeju Special Self-governing Province (1100s)

Abolished local routes

Gallery

References

See also 
 National highways of South Korea
 Expressways in South Korea

 
Roads in South Korea